The Dead Daisies are an Australian-American hard rock band. Formed in Sydney in 2012, the group were initially a duo composed of David Lowy and Jon Stevens, who recorded with session musicians. The band's first touring lineup included guitarist Richard Fortus, bassist Jim Hilbun, drummer Charley Drayton and keyboardist Alan Mansfield. The current lineup of the Dead Daisies features Lowy, guitarist Doug Aldrich (since 2016), vocalist and bassist Glenn Hughes (since 2019), and drummer Brian Tichy (most recently since 2022).

History

2012–15
David Lowy and Jon Stevens formed the Dead Daisies in 2012, and recorded the band's self-titled debut album in 2013 with session musicians. The first touring lineup of the group, which performed in March 2013, included Guns N' Roses guitarist Richard Fortus, former Angels bassist Jim Hilbun, Cold Chisel drummer Charley Drayton and former Dragon keyboardist Alan Mansfield. Hilbun and Mansfield were replaced in April by Marco Mendoza and Clayton Doley, respectively, and Alex Carapetis took over from Drayton in May. In June, Dizzy Reed replaced Doley on keyboards, and in August Frank Ferrer replaced Carapetis. The following month, Brian Tichy first replaced Frank Ferrer, then Darryl Jones took over from Mendoza, respectively on drums and bass guitar.

By October 2013, Drayton had return to The Dead Daisies. In January 2014, Mendoza returned to the band and Jones returned to the Rolling Stones. In February, the Cult's John Tempesta replaced Drayton. He remained until May, when Tichy returned. The group's lineup remained stable for the rest of the year, until founding member Stevens left in February 2015, replaced by John Corabi and Bernard Fowler, while Jones returned on bass. Corabi remained for the recording of Revolución, which began in March with Jackie Barnes temporarily filling in for Tichy. When the band returned to touring, Tommy Clufetos of Ozzy Osbourne's band had taken over the position of drummer. In April, it was announced that Corabi had officially replaced Stevens as lead vocalist.

Since 2015
For an Australian tour in October 2015, long-running guitarist Fortus was temporarily replaced by Dave Leslie after suffering injuries in a motorcycle accident. Tichy also returned. By January 2016, Fortus and Reed had left the Dead Daisies permanently to take part in the Guns N' Roses Not in This Lifetime... Tour, with Doug Aldrich (formerly of Dio and Whitesnake) taking over on lead guitar. The group released their third studio album Make Some Noise in 2016 and their first live album Live & Louder in 2017, then former Journey drummer Deen Castronovo joined in November 2017. The band released their fourth studio album Burn It Down in April 2018. In August 2019, former Deep Purple and Black Sabbath bassist and vocalist Glenn Hughes joined, as both Corabi and Mendoza left.

With Hughes as their new frontman, the band issued The Lockdown Sessions EP in July 2020, followed by their fifth album Holy Ground in January 2021. Just two days after its release, it was announced that Castronovo had left due to "medical issues", with Tommy Clufetos returning to take his place on subsequent tour dates. A year later, Clufetos was replaced by former drummer Brian Tichy for a third tenure.

Official band members

Current

Former

Temporary substitutes

Touring

Session

Timeline

Lineups

References

External links
The Dead Daisies official website

Dead Daisies, The